Pronotocrepis is a genus of plant bugs in the family Miridae. There are at least three described species in Pronotocrepis.

Species
These three species belong to the genus Pronotocrepis:
 Pronotocrepis clavicornis Knight, 1929
 Pronotocrepis ribesi Knight, 1969
 Pronotocrepis rubra Knight, 1969

References

Further reading

 
 
 

Phylinae
Articles created by Qbugbot